The Sula is a river in Leshukonsky District of Arkhangelsk Oblast in Russia. It is a right tributary of the Mezen. The major tributaries of the Sula are the Pyshega and the Omza (both left).

The Sula starts on the Kozminsky Kamen Plateau, part of the Timan Ridge. It generally flows in the south-western direction. 

The valley of the Sula is one of the most remote areas of Arkhangelsk Oblast. There are no settlements on the river, except for the village of Zasulye in the mouth of the Sula. There are several wooden houses, located all over the river course and used by seasonal hunters. In the middle course of the Sula, a road runs parallel to the river. This road connects the Mezen valley (the village of Ust-Kyma) with the Pechora valley (the village of Ust-Tsilma) and is not passable for ordinary cars.

References

External links

Rivers of Arkhangelsk Oblast